is a Japanese composer, rock and EBM musician who performs under the moniker Agraph.

He is a member of Japanese rock band Lama. Together with Lama, he released two full-length studio records: New! in 2011 and Modanica a year later. Both albums charted on the Japanese Albums Chart.

As an EBM musician, he released three albums, all of which peaked in the Japanese Albums Chart. He wrote and composed soundtracks for several anime television series and movies, such as A Silent Voice, Chainsaw Man, Devilman Crybaby and Liz and the Blue Bird.

Biography 
As a child, Ushio learned playing piano. He studied arts and music at university. At the same time, he learned the usage of the audio editor software Pro Tools. At the age of 20, Ushio got his first contact with electronic music, such as techno. He started his solo career in 2007 under the moniker Agraph and began creating electronic music. His debut album A Day, Phases, which was produced by Takkyu Ishino, was released in December 2008. Two years later, his second album Equal was released, which ranked in the Japanese Albums Charts. In 2011, Ushio and some former musicians of bands like Supercar and Number Girl formed a rock band called Lama. The band released two albums, which both ranked on the official Albums Charts of Japan.

Due to his involvement in Lama, Ushio's third album named The Shader was released in 2016, six years after his second album. Ushio works as composer of film music as well, with a particular focus on animated projects. Among his film and television credits are music composition for Space Dandy (2014), A Silent Voice (2016), Liz and the Blue Bird (2018), and Boogiepop and Others (2019). He is a frequent collaborator of directors Masaaki Yuasa and Naoko Yamada, as well as the animation studio Science Saru, for which he has composed the scores of Ping Pong the Animation (2014), Devilman Crybaby (2018), Japan Sinks: 2020 (2020), and The Heike Story (2021). In December 2021, Ushio was confirmed as the composer for MAPPA's anime adaptation of Tatsuki Fujimoto's manga series Chainsaw Man, which premiered on October 12, 2022 on TV Tokyo and other networks. He also arranged music for the Distant Future chapter of the Live a Live remake, originally composed by Yoko Shimomura, which released on July 22, 2022.

Discography

Solo

LAMA

Works

Anime

Video games

References

External links 
 Official website (Japanese)
 Kensuke Ushio at the Internet Movie Database
 Kensuke Ushio in the VGMdb
 Kensuke Ushio on Discogs
 Kensuke Ushio at Anime News Network

1983 births
21st-century Japanese composers
21st-century Japanese male musicians
Anime composers
Japanese keyboardists
Living people
Musicians from Tokyo